Tatarstan Airlines  was the regional airline of the Republic of Tatarstan, part of the Russian Federation. It was based at Kazan Airport in Kazan, Tatarstan, Russia and operated from 1993 until 2013.

History

Tatarstan Airlines was founded in 1993 and started flights in 1999. It operated scheduled flights to destinations in Russia and abroad including seasonal charter flights to holiday destinations.

In 2012, Tatarstan Airlines announced that it would work with Turkish Airlines to make Kazan airport a federal hub.

In November 2013, the crash of Tatarstan Airlines Flight 363 claimed the lives of all 50 passengers and crew. Russia's air transport regulator Rosaviatsiya recommended that Tatarstan Airlines' operating license be withdrawn after air incident investigators concluded that the crash was due to overworked and inadequately trained crew.  The airline's operating license was revoked on 31 December 2013 and its aircraft were transferred to Ak Bars Aero.

Destinations

Tatarstan Airlines operated scheduled passenger services to cities in Russia including Moscow, Saint Petersburg and Makhachkala as well as international destinations Baku, Dushanbe, Yerevan, Tashkent, Khujand, Istanbul, Prague and Tel Aviv. Tatarstan Airlines operated charter services in Russia, Bulgaria, Egypt, Greece and Turkey. In 2010–2011, Tatarstan Airlines flew 40 routes. In 2009 it carried 577,000 passengers, which grew to 603,000 in 2010 and 824,000 in 2011.

Codeshare agreements
Tatarstan Airlines had codeshare agreements with the following airlines (as of November 2013):
 Ak Bars Aero
 Czech Airlines (SkyTeam)
 Turkish Airlines (Star Alliance)

Fleet

Accidents and incidents

On 17 November 2013, Boeing 737-500 (VQ-BBN) arriving from Moscow crashed on landing at Kazan International Airport. All 44 passengers and 6 crew members were killed. The crash resulted in the temporary closure of the airport.

References

External links

 

Airlines established in 1993
Airlines disestablished in 2013
Defunct airlines of Russia
Transport in Kazan
Companies based in Kazan
1993 establishments in Russia
2013 disestablishments in Russia